Burayu is a town and woreda in Oromia Region, Ethiopia, located in the Oromia Special Zone Surrounding Finfinne in the Oromia Region, directly adjacent to the Oromo and national capital Addis Ababa (known as Finfinne in Oromia). With the growth of the capital in recent decades and urban sprawl, the town has faced considerable economic and demographic pressures; its population leapt from around 10,000 in 1994 to an estimated 150,000 two decades later, as people, including many from the Southern Nations, Nationalities, and Peoples' Region, migrated from the countryside looking for work, and residents of Addis Ababa pushed outwards seeking cheaper housing.

In 2018, a massacre occurred in Burayu in which 55 people were killed.

On 19 January 2022, during the Ethiopian Orthodox Christian religious festival Timkat, Oromo police shot into a crowd of Ethiopian Orthodox parishoners of the Saint Mary Church at Burayu. The security forces of Oromia killed two believers and several people were injured, including elderly, women and children. This incident was said to have happened because of the flag that the parishoners used, a green, yellow and red flag with the Ethiopian Orthodox logo over it.

References

Populated places in the Oromia Region
Ethiopia
Cities and towns in Ethiopia